Sheree Monique Gray (born December 12, 1985) is an American soccer defender who represents Sky Blue FC of Women's Professional Soccer.

She signed for Sky Blue in July 2011, having previously played for Saint Louis Athletica in the 2009 Women's Professional Soccer season.

References

External links
 
 Saint Louis Athletica player profile
 Penn State player profile

1985 births
Living people
Penn State Nittany Lions women's soccer players
Sportspeople from Toms River, New Jersey
Saint Louis Athletica players
NJ/NY Gotham FC players
Women's Professional Soccer players
Women's association football defenders
American women's soccer players